Devil's Canyon is a 1953 American Western 3-D film directed by Alfred L. Werker. The film stars Virginia Mayo, Dale Robertson, Stephen McNally and Arthur Hunnicutt.

Plot
Arizona, 1897: A female outlaw, Abby Nixon, warns a lawman, Billy Reynolds, that her accomplices Bud and Cole Gorman are nearby. Reynolds manages to kill both in a gunfight, but finds himself arrested for murder, convicted and sentenced to a desert prison known as Devil's Canyon.

One of the prisoners there is a third Gorman brother, the ruthless Jesse, who intends to gain revenge for Reynolds having killed his kin. Jesse is also romantically involved with Abby, but is unaware that she's the one who tipped off Reynolds as to his brothers' whereabouts.

Reynolds is treated fairly by Morgan, the warden, but not by Captain Wells, a sadistic guard. Abby ends up sent to Devil's Canyon herself for a robbery. To keep her as far as possible from the male inmates, Abby is assigned to work with Dr. Betts in the prison infirmary. She treats Reynolds' wounds after Jesse injures him in a fight.

Abby plots a jailbreak. Sneaking guns to Joe and Red, outlaw partners of Jesse, she tries to persuade Reynolds to join them. He refuses, respecting the law and also not trusting Jesse a bit. Wells finds knives in Reynolds' cell, planted there by Jesse.

During the breakout, Jesse takes over the prison and guns down Wells in cold blood. Guards are taken hostage and the other prisoners are set free. Abby, now afraid of Jesse and his violent ways, is slapped by him and left behind. She manages to free Reynolds, who takes over the guards' machine-gun nest, kills Jesse and orders the others back to their cells. The warden vows to do everything in his power to grant Reynolds and Abby a pardon for their crimes.

Cast
 Virginia Mayo as Abby
 Dale Robertson as Reynolds
 Stephen McNally as Jesse
 Arthur Hunnicutt as Frank Taggert
 Robert Keith as Warden Morgan
 Jay C. Flippen as Capt. Wells
 George J. Lewis as Colonel Jorge Gomez
 Whit Bissell as Virgil Gates 
 Earl Holliman as Joe
 Paul Fix as Gatling Guard

References

External links
 
 
 

1953 films
American Western (genre) films
1953 Western (genre) films
1953 3D films
American 3D films
RKO Pictures films
Films directed by Alfred L. Werker
Films scored by Daniele Amfitheatrof
1950s English-language films
1950s American films